Ted Jackson is a photographer.

Ted Jackson may also refer to:

Ted Jackson, character in The Power and the Glory (1941 film)
Ted Jackson, character on List of Life of Riley characters

See also
Edward Jackson (disambiguation)
Theodore Jackson, drummer with Distorted Pony and other bands